This is a list of Lafayette Leopards football players in the NFL Draft.

Key

Selections

References

Lists of National Football League draftees by college football team

Lafayette Leopards NFL Draft